Kalderash Romani is a group of Vlax dialects spoken by the Kalderash Romani, mainly in Romania. Its main contact language is Romanian.

The Bible was translated to Kalderash Romani by Matéo Maximoff.

Orthography

References

Kalderash
Romani in Romania
Dialects of Romani
Languages of Romania